The 1974–75 season was Blackpool F.C.'s 67th season (64th consecutive) in the Football League. They competed in the 22-team Division Two, then the second tier of English football, finishing seventh.

Mickey Walsh was the club's top scorer, with thirteen goals (twelve in the league and one in the League Cup).

Glyn James retired at the end of the season after fifteen years of service for Blackpool, his only professional club.

On 24 August, 18-year-old Blackpool fan Kevin Olsson was fatally stabbed in the Bloomfield Road stands during the Blackpool v. Bolton Wanderers League match. No arrest was ever made for the murder. 25 years later, a plaque commemorating Olsson was installed on the exterior wall of Bloomfield Road's North-West Stand.

Table

Notes

References

Blackpool F.C.
Blackpool F.C. seasons